Peter Joseph McArdle (22 March 1929 – 24 June 1985) was an Irish born long-distance runner who became a U.S. citizen, taking a gold medal for the United States at the 1963 Pan American Games in São Paulo, Brazil.

Ireland
As a resident of Blackrock, County Louth he trained at the greyhound track on Sandy Lane and in athletics he won twelve National titles between 1951 and 1956 before emigrating to the United States in 1956.

United States
McArdle was selected for the United States team for the 1964 Summer Olympics in Tokyo. He completed in the Athletics at the 1964 Summer Olympics – Men's marathon in a time of 2.25 finishing in 23rd place.

References

External links
 Obituary NYT
 

1929 births
1985 deaths
American male long-distance runners
Athletes (track and field) at the 1963 Pan American Games
Athletes (track and field) at the 1964 Summer Olympics
Olympic track and field athletes of the United States
Irish emigrants to the United States
Irish male long-distance runners
Irish male marathon runners
Pan American Games track and field athletes for the United States
Pan American Games medalists in athletics (track and field)
Pan American Games gold medalists for the United States
People from Dundalk
Sportspeople from County Louth
Pan American Games bronze medalists for the United States
Irish greyhound racing trainers
Medalists at the 1963 Pan American Games